Maura Fabbri (born 2 November 1951) is an Italian former professional footballer who played as a midfielder for Genoa.

Honours

International 
Italy
1969 European Competition for Women's Football

References

1951 births
Women's association football midfielders
Italian women's footballers
Italy women's international footballers
Serie A (women's football) players
Footballers from Genoa
Living people